Bland Shire is a local government area in the Riverina region of New South Wales, Australia. it covers an area of . As at the  the population was 5,995. It is a member of the League of Extraordinary Communities which was established by Dull, Perth and Kinross, Scotland and Boring, Oregon, USA.

The major economic activities of the shire are agriculture, mining, transport, tourism and wholesale distribution.

History 
The farm community of Bland Shire was a former gold prospecting site in the Riverina region, centred on West Wyalong.

The shire was named in honour of William Bland.

Location and settlements
Bland Shire is located on the boundary between the central west and Riverina regions. The area is adjacent to the Newell and Mid-Western highways.

The largest town and council seat is West Wyalong. The region also includes the towns of Wyalong, Barmedman, Tallimba, Ungarie, Weethalle and Mirrool. The major economic activities of the shire are agriculture, mining, transport, tourism and wholesale distribution.

Twin towns
In 2013, the community joined Dull in Perthshire, Scotland and Boring in Oregon, USA to create a "League of Extraordinary Communities" to group Dull, Boring and Bland as a means of encouraging travel, promoting all three communities.

Climate

Average temperature are: maximum , minimum . The prevailing wind direction is north east in the morning and south west in the afternoon and evening, with predominantly calm conditions.

Topography, flora and fauna, and geology

Main tree species include: kurrajong, cypress pine, mallee, box, ironbark, belah and wilga. Native pasture plants include: wallaby grasses, Queensland blue grass and plains and wire grass. Native fauna include: water fowl, red and grey kangaroos, echidnas, goannas, possums, bats and mallee fowls.

Soil are predominantly clay with some granite soil and red brown earth, mostly neutral in pH.

Council

Current composition and election method

Bland Shire Council is composed of nine councillors elected proportionally as a single ward. All councillors are elected for a fixed four-year term of office. The mayor is elected by the councillors at the first meeting of the council. The most recent election was held on 4 December 2021, and the make-up of the council is as follows:

The current Council, elected in 2021, in order of election, is:

Demographics

References

External links

 
Local government areas of New South Wales
Newell Highway